Cuscuta coryli, synonym Grammica coryli, common name hazel dodder, is a perennial plant in the Cuscutaceae family  native to North America.

Conservation status in the United States
It is listed as a special concern and believed extirpated in Connecticut, as endangered and extirpated in Maryland, as endangered in Ohio, and as historical in Rhode Island.

As a noxious weed
The genus Cuscuta is listed as a noxious weed in Arizona, Arkansas, Massachusetts, Michigan, Oregon, and South Dakota. The genus is also listed as a noxious weed in Alabama, California, Florida, Minnesota, North Carolina, South Carolina, and Vermont, but native species are exempt from the noxious designation in those states.

References

coryli
Plants described in 1842